Breast Cancer Research and Treatment is a scientific journal focused on the treatment of and investigations in breast cancer. It is targeted towards a wide audience of clinical researchers, epidemiologists, immunologists, or cell biologists interested in breast cancer.

The types of articles in this journal include original research, invited reviews, discussions on controversial issues, book reviews, meeting reports, letters to the editors, and editorials. Manuscripts are peer reviewed by an international and multidisciplinary panel of advisory editors. According to the Journal Citation Reports, the journal has a 2020 impact factor of 4.872.

References 

Oncology journals
Breast cancer
Publications established in 1981
Springer Science+Business Media academic journals
English-language journals